Roberts Cirque is a cirque marked by a sheer rock cliff located just west of Zurn Peak along the central-north wall of Toney Mountain in Marie Byrd Land. It was mapped by the United States Geological Survey (USGS) from ground surveys and U.S. Navy air photos, 1959–71, and was named by the Advisory Committee on Antarctic Names (US-ACAN) for John H. Roberts III, U.S. Navy, Chief Commissaryman with the South Pole Station winter party, 1974.

Cirques of Antarctica
Landforms of Marie Byrd Land